Fringe-toed lizards are lizards of the genus Uma in the family Phrynosomatidae, native to deserts of North America. They are adapted for life in sandy deserts with fringe-like scales on their hind toes hence their common name.

Descriptions
Lizards of the genus Uma have a brown and tan coloration that helps them to blend in with the sand. The dorsal surface has a velvety texture with intricate markings. In addition, they also have prominent elongated scales which form a fringe on the sides of their hind toes.  These fringes aid with traction and speed, and help the lizard avoid sinking into loose, sandy dunes.

Fringe-toed lizards also possess upper jaws which overlap the lower ones, preventing the intrusion of sand particles, and nostrils that can be closed at will. Flaps also close against the ear openings when moving through sand, and the upper and lower eyelids have interlocking scales that prevent sand from getting into the eyes.

Geographic range
Fringe-toed lizards range throughout southeast California and southwest Arizona, and extend into northwest Sonora and northeast Baja California.

Habitat
Lizards of the genus Uma are found in low desert areas having fine, loose sand.

Diet
Fringe-toed lizards primarily eat insects, including ants, beetles, grasshoppers, and caterpillars. Flower buds, stems, leaves and seeds of plants are also eaten.

Behavior
Lizards of the genus Uma bury themselves underground in the winter.  They sleep in their burrows,  and use their burrows for protection from predators and extreme temperatures.

Species
Coachella Valley fringe-toed lizard, Uma inornata Cope, 1895
Colorado Desert fringe-toed lizard, Uma notata Baird, 1858
Mohawk Dunes fringe-toed lizard, Uma thurmanae Derycke, Gottscho, Mulcahy, & De Queiroz, 2020
Mojave fringe-toed lizard, Uma scoparia Cope, 1894
Yuman Desert fringe-toed lizard, Uma cowlesi Heifetz, 1941 
Chihuahuan fringe-toed lizard, Uma paraphygas K.L. Williams, Chrapliwy & H.M. Smith, 1959
Fringe-toed sand lizard, Uma exsul  Schmidt & Bogert, 1947
"Uma rufopunctata", the previous name for the Yuman Desert fringe-toed lizard, was found in 2016 to represent a hybrid between U. notata and U. cowlesi.

See also
Meroles, a genus of African lizards with morphological and ecological similarities
Xerocoles, animals adapted to desert environments

References

 
Reptiles of Mexico
Reptiles of the United States
Fauna of the Colorado Desert
Fauna of the Mojave Desert
Fauna of the Sonoran Desert
Endangered fauna of California
Lizards of North America
Taxa named by Spencer Fullerton Baird